Stochastic portfolio theory (SPT) is a mathematical theory for analyzing stock market structure and portfolio behavior introduced by E. Robert Fernholz in 2002.  It is descriptive as opposed to normative, and is consistent with the observed behavior of actual markets.  Normative assumptions, which serve as a basis for earlier theories like modern portfolio theory (MPT) and the capital asset pricing model (CAPM), are absent from SPT.

SPT uses continuous-time random processes (in particular, continuous semi-martingales) to represent the prices of individual securities.  Processes with discontinuities, such as jumps, have also been incorporated* into the theory (*unverifiable claim due to missing citation!).

Stocks, portfolios and markets 

SPT considers stocks and stock markets, but its methods can be applied to other classes of assets as well.  A stock is represented by its price process, usually in the logarithmic representation.  In the case the market is a collection of stock-price processes  for  each defined by a continuous semimartingale

.

The logarithmic representation is equivalent to the classical arithmetic representation which uses the rate of return  however the growth rate can be a meaningful indicator of long-term performance of a financial asset, whereas the rate of return has an upward bias. The relation between the rate of return and the growth rate is

The usual convention in SPT is to assume that each stock has a single share outstanding, so 
represents the total capitalization of the -th stock at time  and 
 is the total capitalization of the market. 
Dividends can be included in this representation, but are omitted here for simplicity.

An investment strategy  is a vector of bounded, progressively measurable
processes; the quantity  represents the proportion of total wealth invested in the -th stock at
Negative weights correspond to short positions. The cash strategy  keeps all wealth in the money market. A strategy  is called portfolio, if it is fully invested in the stock market, that is  holds, at all times.

The value process  of a strategy  is always positive and satisfies

where the process  is called the excess growth rate process and is given by

This expression is non-negative for a portfolio with non-negative weights  and has been used
in quadratic optimization of stock portfolios, a special case of which is optimization with respect to the logarithmic utility function.

The market weight processes,

where  define the market portfolio .  With the initial condition  the associated value process will satisfy  for all   

A number of conditions can be imposed on a market, sometimes to model actual markets and sometimes to emphasize certain types of hypothetical market behavior.  Some commonly invoked conditions are:
 A market is nondegenerate if the eigenvalues of the covariance matrix  are bounded away from zero. It has bounded variance if the eigenvalues are bounded.
 A market is coherent if  for all 
 A market is diverse on  if there exists  such that  for 
 A market is weakly diverse on  if there exists  such that

Diversity and weak diversity are rather weak conditions, and markets are generally far more diverse than would be tested by these extremes. A measure of market diversity is market entropy, defined by

Stochastic stability 

where ties are resolved “lexicographically”, always in favor of the lowest index. The log-gaps
 
These quantities measure the amount of turnover between ranks  and  during the time-interval .

 
of the unit simplex, and if the strong law of large numbers

holds for suitable real constants

Arbitrage and the numeraire property 
We say that a given strategy  has the numeraire property, if for any strategy  the ratio  is a −supermartingale. In such a case, the process  is called a “deflator” for the market.

No arbitrage is possible, over any given time horizon, relative to a strategy  that has the numeraire property (either with respect to the underlying probability measure , or with respect to any other probability measure which is equivalent to ). A strategy  with the numeraire property maximizes the asymptotic growth rate from investment, in the sense that

holds for any strategy ; it also maximizes the expected log-utility from investment, in the sense that for any strategy  and real number  we have

If the vector  of instantaneous rates of return, and the matrix  of instantaneous covariances, are known, then the strategy

has the numeraire property whenever the indicated maximum is attained.

The study of the numeraire portfolio links SPT to the so-called Benchmark approach to Mathematical Finance, which takes such a numeraire portfolio as given and provides a way to price contingent claims, without any further assumptions.

Assuming that such an EMM exists, arbitrage is not possible on  relative to either cash  or to the market portfolio  (or more generally, relative to any
strategy  whose wealth process  is a martingale under some EMM). Conversely, if  are portfolios and one of them is arbitrage relative to the other on  then no EMM can exist on this horizon.

Functionally-generated portfolios 
Suppose we are given a smooth function  on some neighborhood 
We call

the portfolio generated by the function . It can be shown that all the weights of this portfolio are non-negative, if its generating function  is concave. Under mild conditions, the relative performance of this functionally-generated portfolio  with respect to the market portfolio , is given by the F-G decomposition

which involves no stochastic integrals.  Here the expression 

is called the drift process of the portfolio (and it is a non-negative quantity if the generating function  is concave); and the quantities 

Examples 
 The constant function  generates the market portfolio ,
 The geometric mean function  generates the equal-weighted portfolio  for all ,
 The modified entropy function  for any  generates the modified entropy-weighted portfolio, 
 The function  with  generates the diversity-weighted portfolio  with drift process .

Arbitrage relative to the market 
The excess growth rate of the market portfolio admits
the representation  as a capitalization-weighted average relative stock
variance. This quantity is nonnegative; if it happens to be bounded away from zero, namely

for all  for some real constant , then it can be shown using the F-G decomposition that, 
It is an
open question, whether such arbitrage exists over arbitrary time horizons (for two special cases, in
which the answer to this question turns out to be affirmative, please see the paragraph below and
the next section).

If the eigenvalues of the covariance matrix  are bounded away from both zero and infinity, the condition  can be shown to be equivalent to diversity, namely  for a suitable  Then the diversity-weighted portfolio  leads to strict arbitrage
relative to the market portfolio over sufficiently long time horizons; whereas, suitable modifications
of this diversity-weighted portfolio realize such strict arbitrage over arbitrary time horizons.

An example: volatility-stabilized markets 
We consider the example of a system of stochastic differential equations

with  given real constants  and an -dimensional Brownian motion 
 It follows from the work of Bass and Perkins (2002) that this system has a weak solution, which is unique in distribution. Fernholz and Karatzas (2005) show how to construct this solution in terms of scaled and time-changed squared Bessel processes, and prove that the resulting system is coherent.

The total market capitalization  behaves here as geometric Brownian motion with drift, and has the same constant growth rate as the largest stock; whereas the excess growth rate of the market
portfolio is a positive constant. On the other hand, the relative market weights 
with  have the dynamics of multi-allele Wright-Fisher processes. 
This model is an example of a non-diverse market with unbounded variances, in which strong arbitrage opportunities with respect to the market portfolio  exist over arbitrary time horizons, as was shown by Banner and Fernholz (2008). Moreover, Pal (2012) derived the joint density of market weights at fixed times and at certain stopping times.

Rank-based portfolios 
We fix an integer  and construct two capitalization-weighted portfolios: one consisting of the top  stocks, denoted , and one consisting of the bottom  stocks, denoted . More specifically,

for  Fernholz (1999), (2002) showed that the relative performance of the large-stock portfolio with respect to the market is given as

Indeed, if there is no turnover at the mth rank during the interval , the fortunes of  relative
to the market are determined solely on the basis of how the total capitalization of this sub-universe
of the  largest stocks fares, at time  versus time 0; whenever there is turnover at the -th rank,
though,  has to sell at a loss a stock that gets “relegated” to the lower league, and buy a stock
that has risen in value and been promoted. This accounts for the “leakage” that is evident in the
last term, an integral with respect to the cumulative turnover process  of the relative weight in the large-cap portfolio  of the stock that occupies the mth rank.

The reverse situation prevails with the portfolio  of small stocks, which gets to sell at a profit stocks that are being promoted to the “upper capitalization” league, and buy relatively cheaply stocks that are being relegated:

It is clear from these two expressions that, in a coherent and stochastically stable market, the small-
stock cap-weighted portfolio  will tend to outperform its large-stock counterpart , at least over
large time horizons and; in particular, we have under those conditions

This quantifies the so-called size effect. In Fernholz (1999, 2002), constructions such as these are generalized to include functionally generated portfolios based on ranked market weights.

First- and second-order models 

First- and second-order models are hybrid Atlas models that reproduce some of the structure of real stock markets. First-order models have only rank-based parameters, and second-order models have both rank-based and name-based parameters.

Suppose that  is a coherent market, and that the limits

 

and

 

Then the  Atlas model  defined by

 

Under reasonable conditions, the capital distribution curve for a first-order model will be close to that of the original market. However, a first-order model is ergodic in the sense that each stock asymptotically spends   -th of its time at each rank, a property that is not present in actual markets. In order to vary the proportion of time that a stock spends at each rank, it is necessary to use some form of hybrid Atlas model with  parameters that depend on both rank and name. An effort in this direction was made by Fernholz, Ichiba, and Karatzas (2013), who introduced a second-order model for the market with rank- and name-based growth parameters, and variance parameters that depended  on rank alone.

References 

 Fernholz, E.R. (2002). Stochastic Portfolio Theory. New York: Springer-Verlag.

Mathematical theorems
Portfolio theories